Ronjeku (also Romanized as Ronjekū; also known as Ronjekū va Seh Darreh and Ronj Kūh) is a village in Kuhak Rural District, in the Central District of Jahrom County, Fars Province, Iran. At the 2006 census, its population was 161, in 33 families.

References 

Populated places in Jahrom County